Aviation High School, official name Aviation Career & Technical Education High School (24Q610), is a public high school owned and operated by the New York City Department of Education. Formerly known as the Manhattan School of Aviation Trades (SAT), Aviation High School has operated since 1936.

It is located in the Long Island City neighborhood of the New York City borough of Queens. The school accepts students from all five boroughs according to the NYC screened school process. The main focus of the school is to train Federal Aviation Administration licensed Airframe and Powerplant technicians.

As of the 2017-18 school year, the school had an enrollment of 2,086 students and 130 classroom teachers (on an FTE basis), for a student–teacher ratio of 16.0:1. There were 1,033 students (47.5% of enrollment) eligible for free lunch and 59 (2.7% of students) eligible for reduced-cost lunch. The school had a graduation rate of 95% for the 2017-2018 school year.

Educational Emphasis 
Aviation High School is certified by the United States Federal Aviation Administration (FAA) for the training of Aircraft Maintenance Technicians (AMTs). Students who successfully complete the school's technical programs are allowed to take their FAA certification examinations without further qualification.

In order to achieve this, students at the school spend about three to four periods every day in "shop," technology related classes that concentrate on every aspect of an aircraft's structure, systems, and components, as well as more general aviation subjects such as aerodynamics and Federal Aviation Regulations. These specialized classes are taught by FAA-certificated AMTs, many of whom are themselves alumni of the school.

Facilities and Physical Plant
The school's present, main campus, which was completed in 1958, occupies an entire city block at the intersection of Queens Boulevard and 36th Street. The seven-story school building houses academic classrooms, specialized aviation maintenance labs ("shop classrooms"), and a hangar where most seniors apply the skills they have obtained to the maintenance of retired aircraft, many of which were donated by the U.S. military. In October 2000, the school also opened an extension campus at John F. Kennedy International Airport referred to as "the Annex".

Prior to the completion of the Queens Boulevard campus, the school had been located in Manhattan and had been known as the Manhattan High School of Aviation Trades.

Almost 55% of Aviation High School's teachers are alumni.

School Property 
Aviation High School is one of the largest high schools in the city of New York. The school occupies a whole block right next to the 33rd Street–Rawson Street station, served by the 7 train, and Queens Boulevard. It is composed of seven floors, a hangar with multiple general aviation and World War II aircraft, a gymnasium, a cafeteria, and a dedicated hangar. The school is divided into two parts, one section where most administration offices and academic classrooms are located and another section dedicated to aviation maintenance labs, "shop classes", that run from the ground floor up to the sixth. An elevator and two escalators also run throughout the seven floors of the building. Starting in the 2015-2016 school year, the school has undergone major renovations and upgrades that have included a newly renovated gymnasium, cafeteria, rooftops and windows in the auditorium, gymnasium and hangar.

Notable alumni
Michael Bentt, former WBO World Heavyweight Champion and actor went to Aviation H.S. for three years prior to dropping out when selected for the U.S National Boxing Team.
Greg Boyer, former United States men's national water polo team member, 1988 Summer Olympics silver medalist, and 1998 inductee to USA Water Polo Hall of Fame.
Whitey Ford attended and graduated from Aviation High School when it was located in Manhattan. The School was officially Named Manhattan High School of Aviation Trades. There were two buildings, one on East 63rd Street in Manhattan and the other one block away on East 64th Street.
Lou Limmer, Major League Baseball player
Frank Gustave Zarb, an American businessman and former Republican politician. He is perhaps best known as the chairman of the NASDAQ stock exchange during the dot-com boom of the late 1990s. He is also known for his role as the "Energy Czar" under President Gerald Ford during the 1970s energy crisis.
Tony Orlando attended, but did not graduate, and was given an honorary degree at a New York Alumni Association event in Los Angeles.

References

External links 
Aviation High School's Official Website
Aviation Career And Technical High School data from National Center for Education Statistics

Public high schools in Queens, New York
Educational institutions established in 1936
Long Island City
1936 establishments in New York City